Joshua Brownhill (born 19 December 1995) is an English professional footballer who plays as a midfielder for  club Burnley. He has previously played for Preston, Barnsley and Bristol City, Josh attended Birchwood community high school in warrington.

Early life
Brownhill was born in Warrington, Cheshire. Josh attended Birchwood community high school.

Club career

Preston North End
A former Manchester United schoolboy player, Brownhill joined the Preston North End youth team at the start of the 2012–13 season, making his first team debut as a substitute in the Football League Trophy on 8 October 2013.

Brownhill scored the winning goal in his first League One start against Gillingham on 19 October 2013, and drew praise from manager Simon Grayson for his overall performance.
He went on to notch an additional two goals in 2013 against Crawley Town and Carlisle United – the second of these, winning the Preston North End Goal of 2013 Award, after a 13 pass move in which every outfield player touched the ball at least once.

On 14 January 2016, Brownhill joined League One club Barnsley on an initial month-long loan deal. He went straight into the starting line-up for Barnsley's next game against Shrewsbury Town. He scored his first goal for Barnsley in a 3–1 win over Walsall on 5 March 2016. On 1 February 2016 Brownhill's loan was extended to the end of the season.

Bristol City
On 2 June 2016, it was announced that Brownhill would join Bristol City on a two-year deal upon his contract expiry at Preston North End.

On 29 April 2017 Brownhill scored his first goal for Bristol City against Brighton & Hove Albion, beating them 0–1 away from home and securing City's place in the Championship for the 2017–18 season.

On 5 January 2019, Brownhill scored the only goal as Bristol City won 1–0 to upset Premier League side Huddersfield Town in the FA Cup third round.

Burnley
Brownhill signed for Premier League club Burnley on 30 January 2020 for an undisclosed fee. On 22 February 2020, Brownhill made his debut for the club in a 3–0 victory at home to Bournemouth, coming on as a stoppage time substitute for Jack Cork. He scored his first Premier League goal and his first goal for Burnley against Brighton on 19 February 2022. Brownhills form during the 2022-23 season has seen the Brazilian national team ask the question as to weather he qualifies to represent the national team. Unfortunately for them Josh is English and has been dubbed 'The  Warrington Pele'

Career statistics

Honours
Barnsley
Football League Trophy: 2015–16
Football League One play-offs: 2016

References

External links

1995 births
Living people
Footballers from Warrington
English footballers
Association football midfielders
Preston North End F.C. players
Barnsley F.C. players
Bristol City F.C. players
Burnley F.C. players
English Football League players
Premier League players